{{DISPLAYTITLE:Mu2 Cancri}}

Mu2 Cancri is a solitary, yellow-hued star in the zodiac constellation of Cancer. It is visible to the naked eye with an apparent visual magnitude of +5.30.

At the estimated age of 5.6 billion years, Mu2 Cancri is an evolving G-type subgiant star with a stellar classification of G2 IV. It has 1.2 times the mass of the Sun and 1.8 times the Sun's radius. Mu2 Cancri has relatively high metallicity—what astronomers term the abundance of elements other than hydrogen and helium—having a 29% higher abundance compared to the Sun. The star is spinning at a leisurely projected rotational velocity of 3.7 km/s.

References

G-type subgiants
Cancer (constellation)
Cancri, Mu2
Durchmusterung objects
Cancri, 10
067228
039780
3176